Sve sami hedovi is the second studio album from the Serbian hip-hop group, Bad Copy. It was released in 2003 and sold over 5000 copies. Videos were shot for the songs "Uno due tre" and "Možeš ti to", both filmed by Đolođolo.

Track listing
"Intro" (Wikluh Sky) – 1:18
"Pornićari stari" (Ajs Nigrutin/Wikluh Sky/Timjah) – 3:52
"Uno Due Tre" (Ajs Nigrutin/Wikluh Sky/Timjah) – 4:52
"Dosadno bez vas" (Ajs Nigrutin/Timjah/Wikluh Sky) – 4:36
"Pucanj" (Ajs Nigrutin, Timjah, Wikluh Sky) – 3:33
"Svet" (Wikluh Sky, Timjah, Ajs Nigrutin) – 3:31
"Krek hop" (Timjah, Wikluh Sky, Ajs Nigrutin) – 4:41
"Dance (skit)" (Wikluh Sky, Ajs Nigrutin) – 1:25
"Vune mlade" featuring Škabo (Wikluh Sky, Timjah, Ajs Nigrutin, Škabo) – 5:02
"Još litar jedan" (Ajs Nigrutin, Wikluh Sky, Timjah) – 3:22
"Izlomiću lokal (skit)" featuring Bičarke na travi (Wikluh Sky, Bičarke na travi) – 1:01
"Možeš ti to" featuring Bičarke na travi (Wikluh Sky, Timjah, Ajs Nigrutin, Bičarke na travi) – 4:21
"Marketing 1 (skit)" (Wikluh Sky, Ajs Nigrutin, Timjah) – 0:40
"Mood Raw" featuring Seven & Bvana (Seven, Ajs Nigrutin, Timjah, Bvana, Wikluh Sky) – 4:26
"Primite pozdrave" (Ajs Nigrutin, Wikluh Sky, Timjah) – 2:56
"Tatule" (Ajs Nigrutin, Timjah, Wikluh Sky) – 4:10
"Profitabilni diskovi" (Ajs Nigrutin, Wikluh Sky) – 2:43
"Svetlost blica" featuring Bičarke na travi (Bičarke na travi) – 1:14
"Uput" featuring Bičarke na travi (Ajs Nigrutin, Wikluh Sky, Timjah, Bičarke na travi) – 2:40
"Sarma spremna" (Ajs Nigrutin, Wikluh Sky, Timjah) – 5:10
"Da zapalimo" (Wikluh Sky, Timjah) – 3:29
"Marketing 2 (skit)" (Wikluh Sky, Timjah) – 1:10
"Mučenje" (Ajs Nigrutin, Wikluh Sky, Timjah) – 5:14
"Porno ganksta" (Wikluh Sky) – 1:21

References
One Records
discogs

2003 albums
Bad Copy albums
One Records (Serbia) albums